The 2nd San Remo Grand Prix was held on April 13, 1947, for International Sports Cars at the 2.62 km Ospedaletti short circuit (clockwise). Racing was scheduled for 750cc (S750), 1100cc (S1.1) and 1100cc+ (S+1.1) class categories in three separate events.

S 750 Classification

S 1.1 Classification

S+ 1.1 Classification

References

External links
II San Remo Grand Prix Ospedaletti Circuit blog
1947 San Remo GP World Sports Car Racing
1947 Racelist Racing History Data

Sports car races
San Remo Grand Prix
San Remo